W. H. Johnson may refer to:
 William Johnson (surveyor) (died 1883), British surveyor in India
 W. H. Johnson Jr., American politician from Mississippi